{{DISPLAYTITLE:NZR WJ class}}

The NZR WJ class was a class of one steam locomotive built by Baldwin Locomotive Works for service on New Zealand's private Wellington and Manawatu Railway (WMR). She acquired the WJ classification when the publicly owned New Zealand Railways Department (NZR) purchased the WMR and its locomotive fleet in 1908.

Introduction 
The locomotive entered service in July 1904 with WMR road No. 3 (reused). She was the first WMR locomotive to have piston valves.

A massive 2-8-4T tank engine, known as Jumbo, she was based at Wellington for all her life. She was acquired for banking duty out of Wellington up the Ngaio bank to Johnsonville, which had long grades of 1 in 40 up to Crofton (Ngaio) and Khandallah and tunnels No 1 to 5.

She had worked 67,907 miles by 29 February 1908. Drivers and firemen alike, it has been written, hated Jumbo, but all agreed that for sheer brute strength this engine took a lot of beating. Like all Baldwin locomotives, the locomotive had cast frames of the bar type. In this case, they gave considerable trouble, for they persistently broke immediately behind the smokebox saddle.

When taken into the NZR fleet in 1908, she was allocated her own class and NZR No. 466. With a tendency for breaking the bar frames on the heavy banking duty, she saw little service after 1920.

Withdrawal 
The locomotive was withdrawn in 1927 and written off on 31 March 1928. The boiler was sent to the Taumarunui locomotive depot for use as a washout boiler.

References

Bibliography 

 

McGavin, T. A. The Manawatu Line (Wellington NZRLS, 1958, 2nd edn 1982)

External links
Writing off, 1927

Wj class
2-8-4T locomotives
Baldwin locomotives
3 ft 6 in gauge locomotives of New Zealand
Scrapped locomotives
Railway locomotives introduced in 1904